Eugenio Gestri (27 October 1905 – 2 September 1944) was an Italian professional road bicycle racer. He was born at Prato, where he also died.

In 1931, Gestri won the 14th stage of the 1931 Tour de France.

Major results

1930
Coppa Bernocchi
1931
Predappio - Roma
Tour de France:
Winner stage 14
1934
Giro delle Due Province Messina

External links 

Official Tour de France results for Eugenio Gestri

1905 births
1944 deaths
People from Prato
Italian male cyclists
Italian Tour de France stage winners
Sportspeople from the Province of Prato
Cyclists from Tuscany